Erik Jensen (born  1988) is an Australian journalist and author, known for his 2014 biography of artist Adam Cullen, Acute Misfortune: The Life and Death of Adam Cullen, and as founding editor of The Saturday Paper.

Early life
Jensen went to primary school in Fiji, attending a Methodist school for a while. He said that it was while he was there that he discovered that his parents were "godless", so he prayed for them for about six months before he "left God at about six and a half".

Career
Jensen started writing for music magazines when he was 15, and The Sydney Morning Herald employed him as a critic when he was 16. After finishing high school, the Herald took him on as a news reporter, a role he was in for five years, until at the age of 23 he became summer editor at the paper. While he was at the Herald, he won a Walkley Award for Young Print Journalist of the Year in 2010.

In 2008, Archibald Prize-winning artist Adam Cullen asked Jensen to live with him and write his biography. He stayed for about four years, in the role of observer as Cullen dealt in drugs and was arraigned for weapons possession. Jensen was even shot in the leg by Cullen, to prove his commitment to the book. After Cullen's death in 2012, Jensen completed and published his biography, titled Acute Misfortune: The Life and Death of Adam Cullen. He later said "...I allowed myself to be in fairly traumatic settings during that book, because I had convinced myself that the professional response was to be absent from them" and that  he "[needed] to continue working on the project to properly extricate [himself] from it".

He had met publisher Morry Schwartz while he was at the Herald and together they decided to launch a Saturday newspaper. Jensen moved to Melbourne in 2013 in order to prepare for publication of the new weekly newspaper. The Saturday Paper was launched in February 2014, as a return to "old fashioned journalism", and based on Jensen's drive to "reconnect journalism with writing" and away from "just arranging facts from most important to least important". Jensen remained editor until June 2018, when Vice Media features editor Maddison Connaughton was appointed to the position, when Jensen became editor-in-chief of Schwartz Media.He was the paper's representative on the judging panel for the annual Horne Prize since its inception in 2016, being replaced by Connaughton in 2019.

In 2017, Jensen published an essay, Erik Jensen on Kate Jennings, in the monograph series Writers on Writing, in which he writes about the Australian novelist, poet and feminist Kate Jennings.

Jensen co-wrote the screenplay of the 2019 film Acute Misfortune, with director Thomas M. Wright. He has also written for television.

In 2019, he released a Quarterly Essay about that year's federal election, titled The Prosperity Gospel. It was described as a "dazzling report from the campaign trail".

In 2021, he released a collection of poetry, titled I Said The Sea Was Folded.

, Jensen continues as editor for the Saturday Paper and editor-in-chief of Schwartz Media.

Awards
, Jensen has won the following awards:
2010: Walkley Award for Young Australian Journalist Award, Print News
2015: for Acute Misfortune: The Life and Death of Adam Cullen
Winner, "The Nib", CAL Waverley Library Award for Literature, Alex Buzo Shortlist Prize
Winner, "The Nib", CAL Waverley Library Award for Literature
Shortlisted, Victorian Premier's Literary Awards, Nettie Palmer Prize for Non-Fiction
2019: for Acute Misfortune (2019 film)
Nominated, Film Critics Circle of Australia – Best Screenplay, Original or Adapted
Nominated, AACTA Awards, Best Indie Film

References

Further reading

Living people
Year of birth missing (living people)
21st-century Australian journalists
Australian newspaper editors
The Sydney Morning Herald people